Paul Frederick Schreiber (October 8, 1902 – January 28, 1982) was a pitcher in Major League Baseball. He pitched in ten games for the  Brooklyn Robins during the 1922 and 1923 baseball season. He returned to the major leagues as a batting practice pitcher and coach for the New York Yankees.  In , while he was coaching for the Yanks,  he briefly came out of retirement to pitch in two more games when the staff was depleted due to World War II. His span of 22 years and 2 days between consecutive major league appearances remains an MLB record.

Schreiber then was a coach for the Boston Red Sox for 13 seasons, from 1946 to 1958, and scouted for them during the 1960s.

Early life and career
Schreiber graduated from Duval High School in Jacksonville, Florida in 1918. For two years he played amateur baseball in Jacksonville before signing with the Brooklyn Robins organization in 1919. From 1920 to 1921, Schreiber played for minor league team Lakeland in the Florida State League. In 1922 he played for the Saginaw Aces of the Michigan–Ontario League. Schreiber joined the major league Brooklyn Robins in 1923, although he had appeared in one game for them the year prior. Schreiber pitched in ten games of the 1923 season, however his major league career was shortened in mid-1924 by an arm injury.

Schreiber made a return to baseball in 1930 joining the Allentown Dukes of the Eastern League. He played with Easton in 1932 until the league was dissolved July 17. Afterwards, Schreiber tried semi-pro baseball and was a pitcher on the Brooklyn Bushwicks in 1937.

References

External links

 

1902 births
1982 deaths
Allentown Buffaloes players
Allentown Dukes players
Baseball players from Jacksonville, Florida
Boston Red Sox coaches
Boston Red Sox scouts
Brooklyn Robins players
Harrisburg Senators players
Jacksonville Scouts players
Lakeland Highlanders players
Major League Baseball hitting coaches
Major League Baseball pitchers
New York Yankees coaches
New York Yankees players
Saginaw Aces players
Scottdale Scotties players
Scranton Miners players
Springfield Ponies players
Wilkes-Barre Barons (baseball) players
York White Roses players